Millhaven Institution is a maximum security prison located in Bath, Ontario. Approximately 500 inmates are incarcerated at Millhaven.

Opened in 1971, Millhaven was originally built to replace Ontario's other aging maximum security prison, Kingston Penitentiary in Kingston Ontario. A riot at Kingston Penitentiary forced Millhaven to open prematurely. During the period of 1977–1984, a Special Handling Unit (SHU) operated at Millhaven, alongside its general maximum-security population. A new Canada-wide Special Handling Unit was subsequently opened in Sainte-Anne-des-Plaines Quebec, and the Millhaven SHU was closed.

Millhaven also housed the federal inmate intake and assessment unit for the Ontario region, the Millhaven Assessment Unit (MAU), until 2013, when the assessment unit was moved to Joyceville High Medium Institute (JAU), in order to facilitate the closing of Kingston Penitentiary. Federal parole violators were returned to MAU from whichever Ontario region they were arrested in, to appear in front of the National Parole Board for disposition.

Millhaven is one of two identically designed maximum security institutions in Canada. The other is located at Archambault Institution, Sainte-Anne-des-Plaines, Quebec.

Bath Institution

Also located on same property is Bath Institution, a medium security facility located along the shores of Lake Ontario. Opened in 1972, it houses 340 inmates.

Living units

Millhaven consists of three main living units, a segregation unit and a hospital wing. There are approximately 120 men per unit. Units have two levels. Ranges are double-sided and have hydraulically locking metal doors (See video in "External Links" section), housing two inmates per cell. The ranges/cells are designated by alphanumeric code (i.e. B1, H2 etc.).

Main living units are designated by Alpha codes:

A Unit = Federal Intake and Assessment Unit – Ontario region (MAU) (ranges B, C, & D)

E Unit = Federal Intake and Assessment Unit – Ontario region (MAU) (and institutional workers) (ranges F, G, & H)

I Unit = Administrative Segregation/Special Needs

J Unit = Maximum Security Unit (MSU) (ranges K, L, & M)

N Area = Main intersection and security control hub.

MAU (Millhaven Assessment Unit) houses inmates recently sentenced to federal time, in the Ontario region. They are assessed and placed in other prisons according to security needs. MAU is classified as integrated (housing convicts serving time on all types of charges).

MSU (J unit) houses habitually violent offenders, and is non-integrated (no sex offenders, informants or incompatibles). Many inmates with life sentences are also housed in MSU. It is considered a "gladiator school", and convicts who serve time there are revered in the criminal subculture.

On September 30, 2013 Kingston Penitentiary was closed. Many maximum security inmates housed there were transferred to Millhaven. A new 96 bed facility was constructed within the Millhaven compound, to house inmates from the Kingston Pen closure.

Security 

The perimeter is surrounded by a double 9.1-metre (30-foot) razor fence, and has observation towers at the corners.

A 1.2-metre (4-foot) "warning fence" inside the perimeter of the exercise yard acts as a boundary that inmates cannot cross without deadly force being used. Armed patrol vehicles with Colt Canada C8 rifles and parabolic microphones are on guard at all times. There are motion sensors in the outlying property, and multiple CCTV units throughout.

Visitors are subject to personal and vehicle search once on CSC property, and an ION scanner is used upon entry to detect drugs or other compounds on clothing or personal objects. The visiting area is equipped with CCTV, and listening devices are embedded in each table.

Inmates in the MAU (intake - A and E units) are allowed only screened visits, behind glass.

Notable events 

Over the years, the institution has seen its share of violence. J unit is considered one of the most dangerous places in Canada's prison system. The most unruly inmates are often housed there.

On July 10, 1972, fourteen inmates escaped a recreation yard by clipping the chain link fence. A subsequent manhunt was undertaken by police and Canadian Forces personnel. Three hundred police officers and soldiers from CFB Trenton created a cordon that eventually yielded the capture of most of the escapees.

On the first anniversary of the August 10, 1975 suicide of prisoner Edward Nalon in the infamous "back hole" at Millhaven, prisoners at Millhaven refused to work and began a hunger strike for improvements to the prison system. They asserted that their strike was in solidarity with a strike at the British Columbia Penitentiary, and their strike inspired sympathy hunger strikes at Collins Bay Institution and Joyceville Institution.In 1977 escapees were shot whilst climbing fences at Millhaven institution. Glenn Thomas Landers was killed while fellow inmate Florant Tanguay was injured by buckshot. Prior to the escape attempt a riot had been staged as well as the inmates had fashioned “zip” guns and had also smuggled a number of .22 rounds into the prison to aid in their escape which ultimately failed. On July 5, 1985, the warden of Millhaven (Al Stevenson) was placed under police protection due to credible threats to his life. The threats came from unknown Millhaven inmates. He was transferring in to Millhaven from Stony Mountain Institution in Manitoba, where he had a reputation of strictness. Warden Stevenson and his family were placed under guard by the OPP (Ontario Provincial Police). This caution was taken due to the 1978 murder of Archambault Institution (Quebec) warden Michel Roy.

In 2004, correctional officers employed at Millhaven Maximum Security were concerned about their safety after a rash of inmate uprisings. The Court of Queen's Bench of Alberta had ruled that an inmate can conceal a weapon (when in prison) if he/she is defending themselves. This ruling sparked a rash of weapon related attacks in the living units.

In May 2009, Millhaven was the site of a riot which lasted less than 24 hours.

On October 12, 2010, a correctional officer with a rifle shot a convict who refused orders to stop assaulting another prisoner in an outdoor recreation yard.

On December 7, 2010, 120 inmates in the assessment unit refused to return to their cells at the end of a recreation period. They began to barricade themselves in the area and guards fired shotguns and used chemical agents to gain control of the situation.

On March 21, 2011, inmate Jordan Trudeau, 29, was killed in an altercation. The event took place in the gymnasium area during exercise for maximum security inmates. Trudeau and another inmate, David Bagshaw, 21, attacked a third inmate and were fired upon by correctional officers in an attempt to gain control of the situation. Trudeau was killed by a shot from a 9mm carbine. Bagshaw was wounded, and was charged with attempted murder in regards to the incident. The OPP Prison Squad investigated the incident, and found CSC staff acted properly.

August 11, 2014, the Canadian Broadcasting Corporation reported that Millhaven Institution was on lockdown to facilitate a major search. Containers that store cereal had gone missing, and was of concern enough to lock down the prison. During the lockdown a serious inmate-on-inmate assault took place.

Controversy 

David Martin, a manager at Millhaven, was arrested in August 2010 and convicted of smuggling various narcotics into the prison, apparently in connection with the Hells Angels. He was found dead in his home on August 21, 2011.

In late April 2013, the Canadian Press acquired freedom of information documents indicating that Federal Public Safety Minister, Vic Toews overruled the Millhaven warden, who had approved a radio interview with Omar Khadr.

In February 2014, an investigation was launched by the Office of the Correctional Investigator of Canada, due to complaints regarding the treatment of mentally ill inmates. These inmates had been transferred to Millhaven after the closure of RTC (Regional Treatment Centre) at Kingston Penitentiary. Photos released to the public show questionable facilities and cleanliness in that unit. Some mentally ill inmates had symptoms worsen upon arriving at Millhaven. There was also concern by the John Howard Society of Canada that the underground "bunker-like" location was a very negative atmosphere for these inmates.

CORCAN 

Millhaven MSU inmates can gain employment in the CORCAN industries shop. Furniture for federal government offices is fabricated there. Inmates receive a small daily wage for this work, approximately $5 a day. Room and board fees are charged to these workers.

National security 

In April 2006, a new division was created to house inmates being held on security certificates. It has been dubbed "Guantanamo". Omar Khadr was transferred to Millhaven from Guantanamo Bay on September 28, 2012, and subsequently transferred to Edmonton Maximum Security Penitentiary on May 28, 2013, due to threats made on his life in Millhaven. Members of a 2006 terrorist plot to attack Canadian targets are incarcerated at Millhaven.

Popular culture 

The song "38 Years Old" by The Tragically Hip refers to an escape from the prison. The opening lines of the song say "12 men broke loose in '73, from Millhaven Maximum Security." There was such an escape in 1972. The lyrics of the song were changed to '73 to rhyme with "maximum security", and there were 14 escapees not 12. The remainder of the song is fiction.

The track "Caller Go Ahead" on Canadian performer Bruce McCulloch's 2002 comedy album Drunk Baby Project features a caller on a sports radio show who is not able to watch televised games while at Millhaven.

Stephen Reid (bank robber of The Stopwatch Gang fame) stated that he was told by an aboriginal inmate whilst incarcerated at Millhaven in 1971 that it was built on a native burial ground. This meant the prison would be forever cursed, and a place of turmoil.

Notable inmates
 Bruce McArthur - serial killer
 Paul Bernardo - serial rapist and murderer
 Dellen Millard and Mark Smich - serial killers
 Hamed Shafia - murderer

References

External links
 Millhaven Institution
Millhaven Maximum Security Cell Video

Buildings and structures in Lennox and Addington County
Correctional Service of Canada institutions
Prisons in Ontario